Albert Henry was a rugby union player who represented Australia.

Henry, a centre, claimed one international rugby cap for Australia. His debut game was against Great Britain, at Brisbane, on 22 July 1899.

References

Australian rugby union players
Australia international rugby union players
Year of birth missing
Year of death missing
Rugby union centres